Aria is an airline based in Mulhouse, France. It operates ad hoc passenger and cargo flights, as well as medevac flights. Its main base is Paris - Le Bourget Airport

History 

The airline was established in March 2004 and started operations in September 2004. It operated a scheduled service between Basle/Mulhouse and Toulouse, but this was suspended on 25 January 2005. The airline hoped to resume and build a regional network, but this has not happened.

Fleet 

The Aria fleet consists of the following aircraft (at March 2007):

1 Raytheon Beech 1900C Airliner
1 Raytheon Beech King Air C90B

References

External links
ARIA official website
  

Defunct airlines of France
Airlines established in 2004
Airlines disestablished in 2005